Cameroon competed at the 1972 Summer Olympics in Munich, West Germany. Eleven competitors, all men, took part in twelve events in three sports.

Athletics

Men's 100 metres
Gaston Malam
 First Heat — 10.88s (→ did not advance)

Men's 1500 metres
Esaie Fongang
 Heat — 3:54.5 (→ did not advance)

Men's 5000 metres
Nji Esau Ade
 Heat — 15:19.6 (→ did not advance)

Men's High Jump
Hamadou Evele
 Qualification Round — 1.90m (→ did not advance)

Boxing

Men's Heavyweight (+ 81 kg)
Jean Bassomben
 First Round — Lost to Hasse Thomsén (Sweden), 1:4

Cycling

Four cyclists represented Cameroon in 1972.

Individual road race
 Joseph Evouna — did not finish (→ no ranking)
 Joseph Kono — did not finish (→ no ranking)
 Nicolas Owona — did not finish (→ no ranking)
 Jean Bernard Djambou — did not finish (→ no ranking)

Team time trial
 Jean Bernard Djambou
 Joseph Evouna
 Joseph Kono
 Nicolas Owona

References

External links
Official Olympic Reports

Nations at the 1972 Summer Olympics
1972
Olympics